Symphonic Music of Yes is a 1993 album by the London Philharmonic Orchestra, covering songs of the progressive rock band Yes, with the English Chamber Orchestra and the London Community Gospel Choir. The arrangements were by Dee Palmer. Playing on the album were Yes guitarist Steve Howe and Yes drummer Bill Bruford. Some tracks also featured Yes vocalist Jon Anderson and featured the ABWH additional keyboardist Julian Colbeck.

Track listing
 Music by Yes; Arranged and conducted by Dee Palmer
 "Roundabout" – 6:10
 "Close to the Edge" – 7:39
 "Wonderous Stories" – 3:52
 "I've Seen All Good People" – 3:50
 "Mood for a Day" – 3:03
 "Owner of a Lonely Heart" – 4:43
 "Survival" – 4:16
 "Heart of the Sunrise" – 7:49
 "Soon" – 6:17
 "Starship Trooper" – 7:17

Personnel
Musicians
 Jon Anderson – vocals
 Steve Howe – electric guitar, 6 & 12 string acoustic guitars, Spanish guitar, steel guitar, Dobro guitar, mandolin, backing vocals
 Dee Palmer – synthesizer, grand piano, vocoder, Hammond organ
 Tim Harries – bass
 Bill Bruford – drums
 The London Philharmonic Orchestra (LPO) on tracks 1 to 4, 6, 8 to 10
 The London Community Gospel Choir on tracks 4 and 7
 The English Chamber Orchestra (ECO) on tracks 5 and 7

Production
 Roger Dean – artwork
 Pete Smith – executive producer 
 Steve Vining – executive producer
 Alan Parsons – orchestra mixer and engineer

References

External links
 Symphonic Music Of Yes at Discogs

1993 albums
RCA Records albums
Albums with cover art by Roger Dean (artist)
Albums arranged by Dee Palmer
London Philharmonic Orchestra albums